Worku (Amharic: ወርቁ) is a male name of Ethiopian origin that may refer to:

Asnaketch Worku (1935–2011), Ethiopian female singer
Ayelech Worku (born 1979), Ethiopian long-distance runner
Bazu Worku (born 1990), Ethiopian marathon runner
Eyassu Worku (born 1998), American basketball player
Mengistu Worku (1940–2010), Ethiopian footballer and coach
Worku Tesfamichael, Eritrea Minister for Tourism
Worku Bikila (born 1968), Ethiopian runner

Amharic-language names